The Western Way is a long-distance trail in Ireland. It is typically completed in seven days. It is designated as a National Waymarked Trail by the National Trails Office of the Irish Sports Council and is managed by Coillte, Galway County Council, Mayo County Council, South Mayo Development Company and Mayo North & East Development Company.

Route

Galway section

Starting from Oughterard, the trail follows the western edge of Lough Corrib before breaking away across the Maumturks chain at the pass of Maumeen.  It descends to the Inagh Valley along the base of the "Turks", following them around to Leenaun at the head of Killary Harbour fjord.  The Galway section ends here and the Mayo section begins.

Mayo section
From Leenaun, the Mayo section of the trail climbs over Sheefry Bridge, then down into Westport, then on through Newport, Sheskin, Ballycastle, Killala, Ballina, ending at Lough Talt in the Ox Mountains near the Sligo border.  It is possible to continue on the Sligo Way.

The Bangor Way & North Mayo Walks
The Bangor Trail is a way marked trail mainly across the blanket bog and fairly rough terrain of the Nephin Beg Mountain range. The trail links the town of Newport in mid west Mayo with the town of Bangor Erris in Erris, North Mayo.  There are several looped way marked cliff walks along the North coast cliffs, Benwee Head and Glinsk overlooking Broadhaven Bay which start from Carrowteige.

References

Notes

Bibliography

External links

 Official Website
 Western Way (Galway) at IrishTrails.ie
 Western Way (Mayo) at IrishTrails.ie

Long-distance trails in the Republic of Ireland
Geography of County Galway
Geography of County Mayo
Tourist attractions in County Galway
Tourist attractions in County Mayo